The women's 200 metres sprint event at the 1948 Olympic Games took place on August 5 and August 6.  The final was won by Dutch athlete Fanny Blankers-Koen. It was the first time this event was included in the Summer Olympics.

Records
Prior to the competition, the existing World record was as follows.

Since it was the first time this event took place, the following new Olympic record was set during this competition:

Schedule
All times are British Summer Time (UTC+1)

Results

Round 1
Round 1 took place on 5 August. The first two runners from each heat advanced to the semifinals.

Heat 1

Heat 2

Heat 3

Heat 4

Heat 5

Heat 6

Heat 7

Semifinals
The semifinals took place on 5 August. The top three runners from each heat advanced to the final.

Heat 1

Heat 2

Final

Key: Est = Time is an estimate, OR = Olympic record

References

External links
Organising Committee for the XIV Olympiad, The (1948). The Official Report of the Organising Committee for the XIV Olympiad. LA84 Foundation. Retrieved 5 September 2016.

Athletics at the 1948 Summer Olympics
200 metres at the Olympics
1948 in women's athletics
Ath